Aracynthus is a genus of planthoppers in the family Fulgoridae, subfamily Poiocerinae. Species are distributed in South America, primarily Brazil.

Species
 Aracynthus fulmineus Nast, 1950
 Aracynthus loicmatilei Bourgoin & Soulier-Perkins, 2001
 Aracynthus sanguineus (Olivier, 1791)

References

Auchenorrhyncha genera
Poiocerinae